Biocoal may refer to:

 Hydrothermal carbonization, a moderate temperature water-based process to convert biomass to a coal-like substance
 Torrefaction, a mild form of pyrolysis to convert biomass to a char-like substance

See also
 biochar